Vladimir Popov may refer to:
 , Russian author
  (1889–1968), Russian actor; see Anna Karenina (1953 film)
 Vladimir Popov (animator) (1930–1987), Soviet animated films director
 Vladimir Popov (footballer) (born 1978), Russian footballer
 Vladimir Popov (wrestler) (born 1962), Russian wrestler
 Vladimir Popov (weightlifter) (born 1977), Moldovan weightlifter
 Vladimir Popov (mathematician) (born 1946), Russian mathematician
 Vladimir Popov, a villain in the 2002 James Bond film Die Another Day
 Vladimir Popov, architect of St. Alexandra's Church, Rostov-on-Don, Russia
 Vladimir A. Popov, composer of the anthem "My Beloved Arctic"